Janelle Monáe is an American singer, songwriter, producer, model and actor currently signed to her own imprint Wondaland Records in connection with Epic Records and Atlantic Records. Since re-releasing their EP Metropolis: Suite I (The Chase) in 2008 on Bad Boy Records, Monáe has received numerous award nominations and has won multiple awards for her music. In 2016, Monáe ventured into acting and received critical acclaim for her roles as Teresa and Mary Jackson in the films Moonlight and Hidden Figures, respectively. These first two acting roles have garnered her additional award nominations and wins.

Music

ASCAP Awards

|-
|rowspan="1"|2010
|Janelle Monáe
|Vanguard Award
|
|-
|rowspan="1"|2019
|"I Like That" 
|Top R&B/Hip-hop songs
|

AICP Post Award
The Association of Independent Creative Editors (AICE) honors the best post production work of the year. Artists are recognized for their contributions in specific crafts within the overall categories of editorial, audio mixing, sound design, color grading, graphic design, and visual effects.

|-
|rowspan="1"|2019
|"I Like That" 
|Best Color Grading Music Video
|
|}

BET Awards

|-
|2014
|rowspan="2"| Janelle Monáe
|rowspan="2"| Best Female R&B/Pop Artist
|
|-
|rowspan="1"|2015
|
|-
|rowspan="1"|2018
| "Django Jane"
|Bet Her Award
|
|-
|rowspan="1"|2019
| "PYNK"
|Bet Her Award
|

Billboard Music Awards

|-
|rowspan="4"|2013 
|rowspan="4"| "We Are Young  
|Top Streaming Song (Audio)
|
|-
|Top Streaming Song (Video)
|
|-
|Top Digital Song
|
|-
|Top Rock Song
|

Billboard Women in Music

|-
|rowspan="1"|2013
|rowspan="2"| Janelle Monáe
|Rising Star Award
|
|-
|2018
|Trailblazer of the Year
|

Black Girls Rock! Awards

|-
|rowspan="1"|2009
|rowspan="2"| Janelle Monáe
|Who Got Next Award 
|
|-
|rowspan="1"|2012
|Young, Gifted & Black Award
|

BreakTudo Awards

|-
|2019
|rowspan="1"| "Unbreakable" (with Kelly Clarkson)
|rowspan="1"| Best Soundtrack Song
|

Brit Awards

|-
|2014
|rowspan="2"| Janelle Monáe
|rowspan="2"| International Female Solo Artist
|
|-
|2019
|

The Daily Californian Music Awards

|-
|rowspan="3"|2018
|"Dirty Computer" 
|Best Album
|
|-
|"Pynk" 
|Best Song (Non-Billboard)
|
|-
|Janelle Monáe 
|Best Artist
|

Edison Jazz-World Awards

|-
|rowspan="1"|2019
|"Dirty Computer" 
|Soul, Funk, R&B Award
|

Essence Awards

|-
|rowspan="1"|2011
|Janelle Monáe
|Black Women in Music Award
|

GAFFA Awards

GAFFA Awards (Norway)
Delivered since 2012. The GAFFA Awards (Norwegian: GAFFA Prisen) are a Norwegian award that rewards popular music awarded by the magazine of the same name.

|-
|rowspan="2"|2018
|Janelle Monáe
|International Artist of the Year 
|
|-
|"Dirty Computer" 
|International Album of the Year 
|

GAFFA Awards (Sweden)
Delivered since 2010. The GAFFA Awards (Swedish: GAFFA Priset) are a Swedish award that rewards popular music awarded by the magazine of the same name.

|-
|rowspan="2"|2019
|Janelle Monáe
|International Artist of the Year 
|
|-
|"Dirty Computer" 
|International Album of the Year 
|

GLAAD Media Award
is an accolade bestowed by the GLAAD to recognize and honor various branches of the media for their outstanding representations of the lesbian, gay, bisexual and transgender (LGBT) community and the issues that affect their lives.

|-
|rowspan="1"|2019
|Janelle Monáe
|Outstanding Music Artist 
|
|}

Grammy Awards

|-
|rowspan="1"|2009
|"Many Moons"
|Best Urban/Alternative Performance
|
|-
|rowspan="2"|2011
|The ArchAndroid
|Best Contemporary R&B Album
|
|-
|"Tightrope"
|Best Urban/Alternative Performance
|
|-
|rowspan="4"|2013
|-
|rowspan="1"|Some Nights
|Album of the Year (as a featured artist)
|
|-
|rowspan="2”|"We Are Young"
|Record of the Year
|
|-
|Best Pop Duo/Group Performance
|
|-
|rowspan="2"|2019
|Dirty Computer
|Album of the Year
|
|-
|"Pynk"
|Best Music Video
|
|-

Hollywood Music in Media Awards

|-
|rowspan="1"|2021
|"Turntable" (from All In: The Fight for Democracy)
|Original Song — Documentary
|

International Dance Music Awards

|-
|rowspan="1"|2011
|Janelle Monáe 
|Best Breakthrough Artist
|

MOBO Awards

|-
|rowspan="1"|2010
|Janelle Monáe
|Best International Act
|

MTV Awards

MTV Europe Music Awards

|-
|rowspan="1"|2012
|"We Are Young" 
|Best Song
|
|}

MTV Video Music Awards

|-
|rowspan="1"|2010
|"Tightrope"
|Best Choreography
|
|-
|rowspan="1"|2012
|"We Are Young"  
|Best Pop Video
|
|-
|rowspan="1"|2013
|"Q.U.E.E.N."
|Best Art Direction
|
|-
|rowspan="3"|2018
|"Pynk"
|Best Video with a Message
|
|-
|rowspan="2"|"Make Me Feel"
|Best Art Direction
|
|-
|Best Editing
|
|-

MTV Video Music Awards Japan

|-
|rowspan="3"|2013
|rowspan="3"| "We Are Young" 
|Best Group Video
|
|-
|Best New Artist
|
|-
|Best Rock Video
|
|-

MTV Video Music Brazil Awards

|-
|rowspan="1"|2010
|Janelle Monáe
|Aposta Internacional (International Bet)
|

Much Music Video Awards

|-
|rowspan="4"|2017
|rowspan="4"|"Venus Fly" (ft. Grimes)
|Best EDM/Dance Video
|
|-
|Best Director
|
|-
|Best Pop Video
|
|-
|Fan Fave Video
|

NAACP Image Awards

|-
|rowspan="4"|2014
|Janelle Monáe
|Outstanding Female Artist
|
|-
|rowspan="2"| "Q.U.E.E.N."
|Outstanding Music Video
|
|-
|Outstanding Song
|
|-
|The Electric Lady
|Outstanding Album
|
|-
|rowspan="2"|2019
|Janelle Monáe
|Outstanding Female Artist
|
|-
|Dirty Computer
|Outstanding Album
|

NME Awards

|-
|rowspan="1"|2011
|"Tightrope"
|Best Track
|

O Music Awards

|-
|rowspan="1"|2011
|The ArchAndroid
|Best iTunes LP
|

People's Choice Awards

|-
|2013
|We Are Young  
|Favorite Song of the Year
|

Pop Awards

|-
|2021
|"Turntables"
|Music Video of the Year
|

Q Awards

|-
|2012
|We Are Young
|rowspan="2"|Best Trak
|
|-
|rowspan="2"|2018
|Make Me Feel
|
|-
|Janelle Monáe 
|Best Solo Artist 
|

Queerty Awards

|-
|rowspan="2"|2018 
|"Pynk"
| Queer anthem
|
|-
|Janelle Monáe 
|Badass 
|

Soul Train Music Awards

|-
|rowspan="2"|2010
|Janelle Monáe
|Centric Award
|
|-
|"Tightrope"
|Best Dance Performance
|
|-
|rowspan="5"|2013
|Janelle Monáe
|Best R&B/Soul Artist
|
|-
|rowspan="4"|"Q.U.E.E.N."  
|The Ashford and Simpson Songwriter's Award
|
|- 
| Best Dance Performance
|
|-
|Video of the Year
|
|-
|Best Collaboration 
|
|-
|rowspan="4"|2014
|Janelle Monáe
|Best R&B/Soul Female Artist
|
|-
|The Electric Lady
|Album of the Year
|
|-
|"Electric Lady" 
|Best Dance Performance
|
|-
|"PrimeTime" 
|Best Collaboration 
|
|-
|rowspan="2"|2015
|Janelle Monáe
|Best R&B/Soul Female Artist
|
|-
|"Yoga"
|Best Dance Performance
|

Shorty Awards

|-
|rowspan="2"|2018
|Janelle Monáe
|Music - Arts & Entertainment
|
|}

Teen Choice Awards

|-
|rowspan="2"|2012
|rowspan="2"|"We Are Young"  
|Choice Rock Song
|
|-
|Choice Single by a Group
|

UK Music Video Awards

|-
|rowspan="1"|2018
|Janelle Monáe
|Best Artist
|

Variety Breakthrough of the Year Awards

|-
|rowspan="1"|2014
|Janelle Monáe
|Breakthrough in Music Award
|

Film and television

Alliance of Women Film Journalists EDA Awards

|-
|rowspan="1"|2017
|Janelle Monáe
|Best Breakthrough Performance (for both Hidden Figures & Moonlight)
|

BET Awards

|-
|rowspan="1"|2017
|Janelle Monáe
|Best Actress
|

Black Reel Awards

|-
|2015
|rowspan="4"| Janelle Monáe
|Outstanding Original Song (for What is Love)  
|
|-
|rowspan="5"|2017
|Outstanding Supporting Actress (for Hidden Figures) 
|
|-
|Outstanding Supporting Actress (for Moonlight)
|
|-
|Outstanding Breakthrough Performance, Female (for Hidden Figures)
|
|-
|Hidden Figures
|Outstanding Ensemble
|
|-
|Moonlight
|Outstanding Ensemble
|
|-
|rowspan="1"|2019
| rowspan = "3"| Janelle Monáe 
|Outstanding Actress, TV Movie or Limited Series (for Philip K. Dick's Electric Dreams) 
|
|-
|rowspan="1"|2020
|Outstanding Supporting Actress (for Harriet) 
|
|-
|rowspan="1"|2023
|Outstanding Supporting Actress (for Glass Onion: A Knives Out Mystery) 
|

Black Reel TV Awards

|-
|2018
|rowspan="2"| Janelle Monáe
|Outstanding Actress, Drama Series (for Electric Dreams)
|
|-
|2020
|Outstanding Actress, Drama Series (for Homecoming)
|

Children's and Family Emmy Awards

|-
|rowspan="1"|2022
| We the People
| Outstanding Short Form Program
|

Critics' Choice Awards

|-
|rowspan="3"|2016
|rowspan=2|Hidden Figures
|Best Supporting Actress
|
|-
|rowspan=2|Best Acting Ensemble
|
|-
|Moonlight
|
|-
|rowspan="3"|2023
|Herself
|#SeeHer Award
|
|-
|rowspan=2|Glass Onion: A Knives Out Mystery
|Best Supporting Actress
|
|-
|Best Acting Ensemble
|
|-

Essence Black Women in Hollywood Awards

|-
|rowspan="1"|2017
|Janelle Monáe
|Breakthrough Award
|

Golden Reel Awards 

|-
|rowspan="1"|2019
|Dirty Computer
|Broadcast Media: Single Presentation
|

Hollywood Film Awards

|-
|rowspan="1"|2014
|"What Is Love?"
|Hollywood Song
|
|-
|rowspan="1"|2016
|Janelle Monáe (for Hidden Figures)
|Hollywood Spotlight Award
|

Independent Spirit Awards

|-
|rowspan="1"|2016
|Moonlight
|Robert Altman Award
|

NAACP Image Awards

|-
|rowspan="2"|2020
|rowspan="2"|Harriet
|Outstanding Ensemble Cast in a Motion Picture
|
|-
|Outstanding Supporting Actress in a Motion Picture
|
|-
|rowspan="1"|2021
|rowspan="1"|Antebellum
|Outstanding Actress in a Motion Picture
|
|-

National Board of Review

|-
|rowspan="1"|2017
|Hidden Figures
|Best Cast
|
|-
|rowspan="1"|2023
|Glass Onion: A Knives Out Mystery
|Best Supporting Actress
|

Palm Springs International Film Festival

|-
|rowspan="1"|2017
|Hidden Figures
|Ensemble Performance Award
|

Queerties Awards

|-
|rowspan="1"|2020
|Harriet
|Best Film Performance
|

Satellite Awards

|-
|rowspan="1"|2017
|rowspan="1"|Hidden Figures
|rowspan="2"|Best Cast – Motion Picture
|
|-
|rowspan="2"|2023
|rowspan="2"|Glass Onion: A Knives Out Mystery
|
|-
|rowspan="1"|Best Actress – Motion Picture Comedy or Musical
|
|-

Science Fiction and Fantasy Writers of America Awards

|-
|rowspan="1"|2019
|Dirty Computer
|Bradbury Award
|

Screen Actors Guild Awards

|-
|rowspan="2"|2017
| Hidden Figures
|rowspan="2"| Outstanding Performance by a Cast in a Motion Picture 
| 
|-
| Moonlight|

Hugo Awards

|-
|rowspan="1"|2019
|Dirty Computer''
|Best Dramatic Presentation (Short Form)
|

Critics awards

Miscellaneous

Council of Fashion Designers of America Awards

|-
|rowspan="1"|2017
|Janelle Monáe
|Board of Directors’ Tribute
|
|-
|rowspan="1"|2018
|Janelle Monáe
|American Ingenuity Award
|

References

Monáe, Janelle
Lists of awards received by American actor